Florence Loiret Caille (born 26 June 1975) is a French actress. She has appeared in more than sixty films since 1996.

Filmography

References

External links 

1975 births
Living people
French film actresses